Virbia lamae, the bog holomelina, is a moth in the family Erebidae. It was described by Thomas Nesbitt Freeman in 1941. It is found in North America in Nova Scotia, New Brunswick, Maine, Wisconsin and Michigan. The habitat consists of open peat bogs.

The length of the forewings is about 10 mm for males and 9.8 mm for females. The male forewings are clay coloured with fawn extending from the base to the postmedial region. The hindwings vary from yellow ochre to salmon with a brown discal spot and brown subterminal markings. The female forewings are clay extending from the base to the postmedial region. The posterior margin is cinnamon brown, sometimes with a faint brown spot and always with a white anellar spot. The hindwings are salmon, with a large brown discal spot and brown subterminal markings. Adults are on wing in July and early August.

Larvae have been reared on dandelion and plantain species.

References

Moths described in 1941
lamae